Central Methodist Church, Lincoln (formerly known as Portland Place Methodist Church) is a Grade II listed Methodist church in the city of Lincoln in Lincolnshire, England. It is an active place of worship in the Boultham area of the city near St Peter at Gowts church. It is one of the most unique listed buildings in Lincoln.

History
The church was built in 1905 and originally opened as Portland Place Methodist Church, it was opened to serve the Methodist branch of Christianity and was built by local architects, Howdill & Sons. The church has continued to play an important role in the local community for over 100 years and was added to Historic Englands listed buildings where it was given a Grade II listing in 1999.

Functions
The church is open to the public and holds religious services, and community events, and has a community shop selling groceries for the community, its called the "Lincoln Community Grocery". It is also part of the Lincolnshire Methodist Churches list, which includes other methodist churches in Lincoln and other places in Lincolnshire.

See also: Churches in Lincoln
St Martin's Church, Lincoln
St Mary le Wigford
St Peter at Arches Church, Lincoln
St Benedict's Church, Lincoln

References

External links

Church of England church buildings in Lincolnshire
Grade II listed churches in Lincolnshire
Central Methodist Church